Massachusetts House of Representatives' 2nd Hampden district in the United States is one of 160 legislative districts included in the lower house of the Massachusetts General Court. It covers part of Hampden County. Democrat Brian Ashe of Longmeadow has represented the district since 2009.

Towns represented
The district includes the following localities:
 part of East Longmeadow
 Hampden
 Longmeadow
 Monson

The current district geographic boundary overlaps with those of the Massachusetts Senate's 1st Hampden and Hampshire district and Worcester, Hampden, Hampshire and Middlesex district.

Former locales
The district previously covered:
 Palmer, circa 1872 
 Wilbraham, circa 1872

Representatives
 Solomon A. Fay, circa 1858 
 Henry Scism, circa 1859 
 William Provin, circa 1888 
 Charles Fay Shepard, circa 1888 
 Herbert L. Miller, circa 1920 
 Frederick A. Warren, circa 1920 
 John Forbes Thompson, circa 1951 
 Iris K. Holland, circa 1975 
 Mary Rogeness
 Brian M. Ashe, 2009-current

See also
 List of Massachusetts House of Representatives elections
 Other Hampden County districts of the Massachusetts House of Representatives: 1st, 3rd, 4th, 5th, 6th, 7th, 8th, 9th, 10th, 11th, 12th
 Hampden County districts of the Massachusett Senate: Berkshire, Hampshire, Franklin, and Hampden; Hampden; 1st Hampden and Hampshire; 2nd Hampden and Hampshire
 List of Massachusetts General Courts
 List of former districts of the Massachusetts House of Representatives

References

External links
 Ballotpedia
  (State House district information based on U.S. Census Bureau's American Community Survey).

House
Government of Hampden County, Massachusetts